Procontarinia matteiana (also known as Mango gall fly and Leaf-gall midge) is a species of midges in the genus Procontarinia of the family Cecidomyiidae that can be found in India, Kenya, Mauritius, and Réunion.

Description
Both sexes have different antennae size, with males having the longest. Another way to tell a difference between the sexes is by looking at their abdomen. The males have distal claspers on its abdomen. They mate in mid air. The males feed on mango trees early morning.

References

External links

Insects described in 1906
Diptera of Africa
Diptera of Asia
Cecidomyiidae